Sam-Ku To (1895–1983) is a former Chinese actress and Cantonese opera singer from Hong Kong. To is credited with over 440 films.

Early life 
In 1895, To was born.

Career 
To started her career as a Cantonese opera singer. In 1936, To crossed over as an actress in Hong Kong films. To appeared in A Fisherman's Girl, a 1936 Drama film directed by Wen Yi-Min. To is known for her role as a greety mother, brothel madam, or landlady. To appeared as a landlady in films such as The Corn in Ripe for Plucking (1948), Four Phoenixes Take Flight (1948), Hanging on Together (1949), A Devoted Soul (Part 1 and Part 2) (1949), and Blood, Rouge and Tears (1950). To's last film was Dog Bites Dog Bone, a 1978 Drama film directed by Michael Lai Siu-Tin and Nancy Sit Ka-Yin. To is credited with over 440 films.

Filmography

Films 
This is a partial list of films.
 1936 A Fisherman's Girl
 1937 The Light of Women 
 1940 The Red Scarf 
 1947 The Evil Mind – Tung Sam-Ku.
 1948 The Corn in Ripe for Plucking – Landlady
 1948 Four Phoenixes Take Flight – Landlady
 1949 Hanging on Together – Landlady
 1949 A Devoted Soul (Part 1 and Part 2) – Landlady
 1950 Blood, Rouge and Tears – Landlady
 1952 Sweet Girl and Good Car (aka Beautiful Woman, Beautiful Car) 
 1953 In the Face of Demolition 
 1955 Sing Her a Love Song 
 1956 Madam Mei – Brothel madam.
 1960 The Eagle Knight and the Crimson Girl – Madam Chiu.
 1962 The Adventure of a Stage-fan (aka The Venture of an Opera Fan) – Landlady 
 1964 Pigeon Cage (aka The Apartment of 14 Families) – Landlady.
 1978 Dog Bites Dog Bone

Personal life 
On March 13, 1983, To died.

References

External links 
 Sam-Ku To at imdb.com
 To Sam Ku at hkcinemagic.com
 To Sam-Ku at mask9.com

1895 births
1983 deaths
Hong Kong film actresses